The Land of Long Shadows is a 1917 American silent drama film directed by W.S. Van Dyke and starring Jack Gardner, Ruth King and Carl Stockdale. It marked the directorial debut of Van Dyke, who later became an established director at MGM.

Cast
 Jack Gardner as Joe Mauchin
 Ruth King as Jeanne Verette
 C.J. Lionel as Roul Verette
 Carl Stockdale as Constable McKenzie

References

Bibliography
 Connelly, Robert B. The Silents: Silent Feature Films, 1910-36, Volume 40, Issue 2. December Press, 1998.

External links

 

1917 films
1917 drama films
1910s English-language films
1917 directorial debut films
American silent feature films
Silent American drama films
American black-and-white films
Films directed by W. S. Van Dyke
Essanay Studios films
1910s American films